Central Darling Shire is a local government area in the Far West region of New South Wales, Australia. The Shire is located adjacent to the Barrier Highway.

The Central Darling Shire Council has been under administration since 2014 with an Administrator taking the place of the mayor and councillors.

Main towns/villages
The Shire includes the towns of Ivanhoe, Menindee, Wilcannia and White Cliffs.

Demographics

According to the Australian Bureau of Statistics during 2003-04 there:
 were 509 wage and salary earners (ranked 162nd in New South Wales and 525th in Australia, less than 0.1% of both New South Wales's 2,558,415 and Australia's 7,831,856)
 was a total income of $18 million (ranked 159th in New South Wales and 522nd in Australia, less than 0.1% of both New South Wales's $107 billion and Australia's $304 billion)
 was an estimated average income per wage and salary earner of $34,391 (ranked 82nd in New South Wales and 268th in Australia, 83% of New South Wales's $41,407 and 89% of Australia's $38,820)
 was an estimated median income per wage and salary earner of $31,477 (ranked 84th in New South Wales and 284th in Australia, 89% of New South Wales's $35,479 and 92% of Australia's $34,149).

Council

Current composition and election method
In 2014 the council placed under administration for a period of three months. Following a public inquiry, councillors were removed from office and an administrator originally appointed for three months had his term extended and at September 2018 was still acting in this capacity. The council is expected to be removed from administration in September 2020.
  
Central Darling Shire Council is composed of nine councillors elected proportionally as three separate wards, each electing three councillors. All councillors are elected for a fixed four-year term of office. The mayor is elected by the councillors at the first meeting of the council. The most recent election was held on 8 September 2012, and the makeup of the council at the time of moving to Administration was as follows:

The previous Council, elected in 2012, in order of election by ward, is:

Economic activity

The principal economic activities within the Shire include pastoral, horticultural, agricultural, mining and tourism. Rural grazing properties represent the largest land use within the Shire, accounting for 97% of the entire area.  Major horticultural and agricultural production is centred on Menindee.  The relative ease of access to water from the Darling River and Menindee Lakes Storage Scheme enables producers to grow a large variety of crops and fruits.

Opal mining has been the predominant mining industry within the Shire. Opal was discovered in White Cliffs in 1884 and the first commercial opal field commenced operation in 1890, reaching its peak in 1899.

See also

List of local government areas in New South Wales

References

 
Local government areas of New South Wales
Far West (New South Wales)
1959 establishments in Australia
Populated places established in 1959